Flor Silvestre, vol. 8 is a studio album by Mexican singer Flor Silvestre, released in 1968 by Musart Records.

Track listing
Side one

Side two

Personnel
 Antonio Bribiesca – guitarist, arranger
 Gustavo A. Santiago – arranger

External links
 Flor Silvestre, vol. 8 at AllMusic

1968 albums
Flor Silvestre albums
Musart Records albums
Spanish-language albums